Aquilino Bocos Merino,  (born 17 May 1938) is a Spanish prelate of the Catholic Church, a member and official of the Claretians. He was Superior General of the order, properly known as the Congregation of Missionaries, Sons of the Immaculate Heart of the Blessed Virgin Mary, from 1991 to 2003. Pope Francis made him a cardinal on 28 June 2018.

Biography
He was born in Canillas de Esgueva, Valladolid, Spain, on 17 May 1938. He attended the seminary of the Missionary Claretians and was ordained a priest in 1963.

He earned a degree in philosophy at the Pontifical University of Salamanca. From 1980 to 1991 he was general counsel of the Claretians. In 1991 he was elected the order's Superior General and served two six-year terms.

In 1994 he participated in the Synod of Bishops on the consecrated life, and he was a member of the Congregation for Institutes of Consecrated Life and Societies of Apostolic Life from 1994 to 2004.

On 20 May 2018, Pope Francis announced he would make him a cardinal on 28 June. He was consecrated as the Titular Archbishop of Urusi in Madrid on 16 June by Cardinal Fernando Sebastián Aguilar with Cardinals Carlos Osoro Sierra and Ricardo Blázquez as co-consecrators. At the 28 June consistory, he was assigned the diaconate church of Santa Lucia del Gonfalone.

See also
 Cardinals created by Francis

References

External links 

Living people
1938 births
21st-century Spanish cardinals
Claretian cardinals
Pontifical University of Salamanca alumni
Cardinals created by Pope Francis